The Bogey Award (officially Box Office Germany Award) is a German film award. It's based on the number of people seeing a film within a given time frame. The prize has been awarded by the industry's trade journal Blickpunkt: Film since 1997. It derives its nickname from a small prise sculpture depicting the actor Humphrey Bogart.

Titanium: Viewed by ten million people.
Platinum: Five million people within the first fifty days of release.
Gold:  Three million people within thirty days.
Silver: Two million people within twenty days.
Bronze: One million people within 10 days.
Bogey Award:  One million people, or 1000 people per copy, with a minimum of 25 copies, within first ten days.

References 

German film awards